Angel Eyes is  the third album by American pianist and arranger Duke Pearson featuring performances by Pearson with Thomas Howard, and Lex Humphries originally recorded in 1961/62 for the Jazzline label but not released until 1968 on the Polydor label. The majority of the tracks (without the title track) were released on CD in 1991 on the Black Lion label as Bags Groove with three additional takes.<ref>[http://www.jazzdisco.org/duke-pearson/catalog/#black-lion-blcd-760149 Duke Pearson discography - Bags Groove entry] accessed September 7, 2010</ref>

Reception
The Allmusic review by Scott Yanow of the Bags' Groove release awarded the album 4 stars and stated "Recommended for straightahead jazz collectors".  

Track listingAll compositions by Duke Pearson except as indicated "Bags' Groove" (Milt Jackson) - 5:02
 "Le Carrousel" - 4:50
 "Angel Eyes" (Earl Brent, Matt Dennis) - 2:42
 "I'm an Old Cowhand from the Rio Grande" (Johnny Mercer) - 4:45
 "Jeannine" - 5:30
 "Say You're Mine" - 5:30
 "Exodus" (Ernest Gold) - 5:50
Recorded at Bell Sound Studios, NYC on August 1, 1961 (tracks 1, 2 & 4-7) and January 12, 1962 (track 3)Bags Groove'' bonus tracks
 "I'm an Old Cowhand (From the Rio Grande)" [Take 3] (Mercer) - 4:31
 "Say You're Mine" [Take 3] - 5:30
 "Le Carrousel" [Take 2] - 4:14

Personnel
Duke Pearson - piano
Bob Cranshaw (track 3), Thomas Howard (tracks 1, 2 & 4-7) - bass
Lex Humphries (tracks 1, 2 & 4-7), Walter Perkins (track 3) - drums

References

Polydor Records albums
Duke Pearson albums
Black Lion Records albums
1968 albums